Rank comparison chart of non-commissioned officers (NCOs) and enlisted personnel for all armies and land forces of the European Union member states.

NCO and enlisted ranks

See also 
 Comparative army officer ranks of the European Union
 Military rank
 Comparative navy officer ranks of the European Union
 Comparative navy enlisted ranks of the European Union
 Comparative air force officer ranks of the European Union
 Comparative air force enlisted ranks of the European Union
 Ranks and insignia of NATO armies enlisted
 Comparative army enlisted ranks of Europe

Notes

References 

Military comparisons